North Gosford is a south-eastern suburb of the Central Coast region of New South Wales, Australia immediately north-east of Gosford's central business district. It is part of the  local government area.

North Gosford is notable for the region's largest private hospital and for Laycock Street Theatre, the region's principal theatre for live dramatic and musical theatre.

References

External links
Laycock Street Theatre, North Gosford
Gosford Private Hospital, North Gosford

Suburbs of the Central Coast (New South Wales)